Dirkie Binneman (8 September 1918 – 25 June 1959) was a South African cyclist. He competed in the individual and team road race events at the 1948 Summer Olympics.

References

External links
 

1918 births
1959 deaths
Afrikaner people
South African male cyclists
Olympic cyclists of South Africa
Cyclists at the 1948 Summer Olympics
Place of birth missing